German Mills Creek is a river in the municipalities of Markham, Richmond Hill, Toronto and Vaughan in the Greater Toronto Area of Ontario, Canada. It is part of the Great Lakes Basin and is a left tributary of the East Branch Don River. It originates in Vaughan (near Bathurst Street and the King–Vaughan Town Line), flows south through Richmond Hill and Markham, and empties into the East Branch Don River in the East Don Parklands in Toronto, south of Steeles Avenue between Bayview Avenue and Leslie Street. It is part of a number of streams, swamps and swales located near the Oak Ridges Moraine.

It is named after the pioneer settlement German Mills, founded by William Berczy in 1796. The settlement disappeared after a few years, but the creek retained the name. The Richmond Hill portions of the river snake through residential development with a very narrow greenbelt on either side of the creek. The Markham sections run through a mix of residential, commercial and light industrial areas.

Duncan Woods Creek is a small left tributary that flows northwest to German Mills Creek in Toronto, at the southeast corner of Steeles Avenue and Leslie Street.

There are a few undeveloped portions along the creek, mostly as parks in Markham.

Parks
 German Mills Settlers Park, (26 hectare or 65 acre natural area park)
 Wycliffe Park, Markham
 German Mills Creek Channel Lands, Richmond Hill
 German Mills Creek Park, Richmond Hill 
 Bestview Park Fitness Trail, Toronto
 Bestview Park
 East Donlands Park
 Maple Valley Park
 Valley View Park
 Doncrest Valley
 Langstaff Park
 German Mills Trail
 Toll Bar Park

Communities
 Elgin Mills, Richmond Hill
 Hillsview, Richmond Hill
 Langstaff, Richmond Hill
 Doncrest, Richmond Hill
 German Mills, Markham
 Hillcrest Village, Toronto

Development
 Newark Industrial Park
 David Dunlap Observatory
 Beaver Creek Business Park

References

See also
 List of Ontario rivers
 Taylor-Massey Creek (Don)

Don River (Ontario)
Rivers of Toronto
Rivers of the Regional Municipality of York